Caicara del Orinoco Airport  is an airport serving the city of Caicara del Orinoco in the Bolívar state of Venezuela. Western approaches and departures cross the Orinoco River.

See also
Transport in Venezuela
List of airports in Venezuela

References

External links
OurAirports - Caicara
SkyVector - Caicara

Airports in Venezuela